The spiny lobster (Lebbeus groenlandicus), also known as the chicken prawn and dokdo shrimp, is a crustacean belonging to the family Hippolytidae. It has a circumboreal distribution. It is found in South Korea on the east coast north of Pohang, Gyeongsangbuk-do, and in Japan from San'in to Hokkaido.

References

Alpheoidea
Crustaceans described in 1775
Taxa named by Johan Christian Fabricius